Cosmopterix attenuatella is a moth of the family Cosmopterigidae described by Francis Walker in 1864. It is widely distributed in the tropics and subtropics of both the Old and New World, including the United States, Bermuda, the Cayman Islands, Virgin Islands, Dominica, Jamaica, Puerto Rico, Trinidad and Tobago, Costa Rica, Brazil, Ecuador, Peru, Argentina, the Canary Islands, Madeira, the Galápagos Islands, Cook Islands, Taiwan, Australia, New Zealand, Madagascar, Seychelles, Mauritius and Saint Helena.

The wingspan is about 9 mm. There are probably two generations per year in the south of the temperate zone and more overlapping generations in the tropics, because here adults can be found throughout the year.

The larvae feed on Poaceae (Melinus minutiflora), Cyperus rotundus and Scirpus species. They mine the leaves of their host plant. The mine has the form of a blotch that descends from close to the tip of the leaf, occupying the entire width of the leaf. Older parts are brown and shrivelled, while youngest parts are yellow. The frass is black. Pupation takes place in an elongate white cocoon within the mine.

References

attenuatella
Moths of Madagascar
Moths of Japan
Moths of Mauritius
Moths of Réunion
Moths of New Zealand
Moths of Africa
Moths of Seychelles